Tomáš Pešír (born 30 May 1981 in Prague) is a Czech former professional footballer who plays as a striker for Ujezd Praha. He had a journeyman career, having played for 11 clubs in his 13-year playing career.

Career

Club
Pešír signed for Scottish First Division side Livingston in July 2007. He made 20 league appearances for Livingston in the 2007–08 season, scoring 7 goals. He played his last game for the club in January 2008, marking the occasion by scoring twice in a 6–1 win against Greenock Morton. In September 2008 he signed with Jagiellonia Białystok.

After leaving Livingston, he returned to Czech Republic and had spells playing for several clubs before signing for Ujezd Praha in 2022.

National team
He played for his country in the 2001 FIFA World Youth Championship. He also represented the Czech Republic at under-21 level, making ten appearances and scoring two goals.

References

External links
 
 
 
 

1981 births
Living people
Czech footballers
Czech Republic youth international footballers
Czech Republic under-21 international footballers
Czech expatriate footballers
SK Slavia Prague players
FK Mladá Boleslav players
FK Chmel Blšany players
FK Baník Most players
Jagiellonia Białystok players
Kayserispor footballers
Nea Salamis Famagusta FC players
Livingston F.C. players
Górnik Łęczna players
Expatriate footballers in Turkey
Expatriate footballers in Cyprus
Expatriate footballers in Scotland
Expatriate footballers in Poland
Scottish Football League players
Czech First League players
Süper Lig players
Cypriot First Division players
Czech expatriate sportspeople in Turkey
Czech expatriate sportspeople in Poland
Association football forwards
Footballers from Prague